Big Brother 13 is the thirteenth season of various versions of Big Brother and may refer to:

Big Brother 13 (U.S.), the 2011 edition of the U.S. version of Big Brother
Gran Hermano 13 (Spain), the 2012 edition of the Spain version of Big Brother
Big Brother 13 (UK), the 2012 edition of the UK version of Big Brother
Big Brother Brasil 13, the 2013 edition of the Brazil version of Big Brother

See also
 Big Brother (franchise)
 Big Brother (disambiguation)